Loch Duich (Scottish Gaelic: "Loch Dubhthaich") is a sea loch situated on the western coast of Scotland, in the Highlands.

History
In 1719, British forces burned many homesteads along the loch's shores in the month preceding the Battle of Glen Shiel.

Eilean Donan Castle
Eilean Donan Castle stands at the meeting point of Loch Duich, Loch Long, and Loch Alsh.

Legends
A legend connected with Loch Duich states that three brothers who went fishing at the loch one night became enraptured by three seal-maidens who had thrown off their furs, assumed the likeness of humans, and danced in the moonlight on the sands.  The brothers stole their furs, intending to claim the seal-maidens as their wives.  The youngest brother, however, moved by the seal-girl's distress, returned her seal-skin.  For his kindness, the girl's father allowed the youngest brother to visit the maiden every ninth night.  As for the other two brothers, the middle brother lost his wife after the seal-maiden he had captured found her stolen fur, while the eldest brother burnt his wife's fur as a preventative measure, only to burn her accidentally in the process.

Connections with Loch Ness
The infamous "McRae film" connected with the Loch Ness Monster was supposedly shot as a close-up of not only "Nessie" in its habitat of Loch Ness, but a second film allegedly shows a similar animal in Loch Duich. Both films are, according to most sources, held in a secret trust, and few people have seen either film. It is still a mystery as to whether the films exist at all, but are accepted by several Loch Ness researchers.

Nature and conservation
Loch Duich, along with the neighbouring sea lochs of Loch Long and Loch Alsh, was together designated as a Nature Conservation Marine Protected Area (NCMPA) in 2014. The designation is in place to protect the lochs' burrowed mud and their flame shell beds.

References

Folklore, Myths and Legends of Britain (London: The Reader's Digest Association, 1973), 444.

Duich
Duich
Nature Conservation Marine Protected Areas of Scotland